Ali Saad Al-Deraan (born 17 April 1990) is a Saudi athlete competing primarily over the 800 metres distance. He represented his country at the 2015 World Championships, reaching the semifinals.

His personal best in the event is 1:45.57 set in Lignano Sabbiadoro in 2015.

Competition record

Personal bests
Outdoors
400 metres – 48.73 (Jamsankoski 2008)
800 metres – 1:45.57 (Lignano Sabbiadoro 2015)
Indoors
800 metres – 1:52.74 (Macau 2007) NR

References

Living people
1990 births
Saudi Arabian male middle-distance runners
Athletes (track and field) at the 2006 Asian Games
World Athletics Championships athletes for Saudi Arabia
Asian Games competitors for Saudi Arabia
21st-century Saudi Arabian people
20th-century Saudi Arabian people